Nicolaj "Nick" Charles Sofus Clausen (23 May 1900 – 23 September 1989) was a Danish boxer who competed in the 1920 Summer Olympics. He was born in Copenhagen and died in Frederiksberg. In 1920 he was eliminated in the quarter-finals of the featherweight class after losing his fight to Jack Zivic.

References

External links
profile

1900 births
1989 deaths
Featherweight boxers
Olympic boxers of Denmark
Boxers at the 1920 Summer Olympics
Danish male boxers
Sportspeople from Copenhagen